Unguicrypteria is a genus of crane fly in the family Limoniidae.

Distribution
Argentina & Chile.

Species
U. ctenonycha Alexander, 1929

References

Limoniidae
Diptera of South America